"Lifelines" was the second single and the title track from A-ha's 2002 album of the same name.

Music video
This video is based on the Norwegian short film A Year Along the Abandoned Road, directed by Morten Skallerud in 1991. Time lapse photography was used to make the video, at 50,000 times the normal speed; the original film was 12 minutes long and was filmed over 105 days, and edited to fit the song length and the scenes with the band members.

The subject of the short film was Børfjord, a semi-deserted fisherman's village in northern Norway, near Hammerfest.

The opening sequence features a poem written by King Olav V of Norway:

Track listings
Europe: CD Maxi, WEA / 0927 47037-2

Europe: CD Maxi, WEA / 0927 47038-2

Europe: Enhanced CD, WEA / 0927 48483-2

Europe: promo, WEA / PR 03215

Germany: promo, WEA / PR 03382

Russia: CD Maxi, WEA, WWW / 5050466225429, НН-138CD/02

Charts

MTV Unplugged appearance 
In 2017, A-ha appeared on the television series MTV Unplugged and played and recorded acoustic versions of many of their popular songs for the album MTV Unplugged – Summer Solstice in Giske, Norway, including "Lifelines".

References

2002 singles
A-ha songs
Songs written by Magne Furuholmen
Song recordings produced by Stephen Hague